Sunan al-Daraqutni,, is a Hadith book (narrations of Prophet Muhammad), and was collected by famous Muhaddith (Hadith Collector) Imam Al-Daraqutni (306 – 385 AH).

Description
The total number of Hadiths in this book are 4836 according to al-Maktaba al-Shamila. In this book al-Daraqutni deliberately collected the famous Moudu (fabricated) and Dhaif (weak in Narration) Hadiths. Beside that al-Daraqutni also mentioned some Sahih (Authentic) Hadiths as well.

Criticism
Most of Hadiths collected by Imam Daraqutni in his book are Moudu' (Fabricated) and Daeef (weak in Narration). Most of the Muhadditheen (Hadith Collectors) agree that the mention of a hadith in his book doesn’t mean that it is allowed to rely on it. Even Imam ibn-e-Taymiyyah said "Daraqutni used to mention the unreliable hadiths in his Sunan, so that he and the other scholars can make it clear that those Hadiths are unreliable" (authentically unverifiable).
On the contrary, according to a research paper submitted at the International Conference on Humanities, the researchers found the methods used by Imam Daraqutni to be reliable “The research findings show that al-Daraqutni’s methods was neither corrupted nor weak as alleged but had firm footing in the methodologies previously practiced by hadith scholars in ancient times.”

Commentaries
Among those  who have written commentaries on this hadith collection are: 
  Sunan al-Daraqutni 6 VOLUMES (سُنَن الْدَّارَقُطْنِي + التَّعْلِيقْ المُغْنِي عَلَى الْدَّارَقُطْنِي) Commentary by Muhammad al-'Azim al-Abadi: Published: Mu'assassat al-Risalah | Beirut, Lebanon  | Damascus/Beirut, in 2004

See also
 List of Sunni books
 Kutub al-Sittah

References

9th-century Arabic books
10th-century Arabic books
Sunni literature
Hadith
Hadith collections
Sunni hadith collections